The Gnoo Blas Motor Racing Circuit was a motor racing circuit at Orange, New South Wales, Australia. The circuit was formed from rural roads and highways outside the town, around the grounds of Bloomfield Hospital and what is now known as Sir Jack Brabham Park. It was 6.03 km long. The name came from the Aboriginal name for nearby Mount Canobolas.

The first race meeting was staged over the Anniversary Day holiday weekend of 24 to 26 January 1953 and was organized by the Australian Sporting Car Club, the former promoters of the Easter car races at the Mount Panorama Circuit, Bathurst. The January 1955 meeting, which featured the 1955 South Pacific Championship for racing cars, was the first FIA sanctioned international race meeting to be staged in Australia. The circuit played a crucial part in the growth of Australian open wheel racing in the post war era but faded before the peak created by the Tasman Series.

Gnoo Blas hosted the inaugural Australian Touring Car Championship event in 1960, the race being won by David McKay driving a Jaguar Mark 1 3.4-litre. Also competing were Bill Pitt (2nd), Ron Hodgson (3rd), Bruce McPhee, Des West, Ian Geoghegan and Brian Foley.

Continuing battles with New South Wales Police Force who authorised motor racing through the Speedway Act eventually forced the track's closure, with the last race meeting being held on 22 October 1961.

The locally based Gnoo Blas Classic Car Club hold an annual classic car show at the site.

Results of major races

Gallery

References 

Former Supercars Championship circuits
Defunct motorsport venues in Australia
Motorsport at Gnoo Blas
Motorsport venues in New South Wales
City of Orange